Fred Price DuVal (born May 24, 1954) is an American businessman, civic leader, education leader and author. He is president of DuVal and Associates, a senior advisor to Dentons Law, an advisor to Macquarie Infrastructure, Chairman of Excelsior Mining, and in his second term as a member of the Arizona Board of Regents is Chair-elect and former Chairman. He was the Democratic nominee for Governor of Arizona in the 2014 election, but was defeated by then-State Treasurer Doug Ducey. He is a former Deputy Chief of Protocol and also former senior White House staff to President Clinton responsible for coordinating federal policy with the nations Governors.

Early life and education
Fred Price DuVal was born in Ridgewood, New Jersey and was raised in Tucson, Arizona. DuVal graduated from Tucson High School and received a B.A. from Occidental College, where he was selected as a Luce Scholar. DuVal received his Juris Doctor degree from Arizona State University (ASU).

Political career

Babbitt administration and 1988 campaign 
DuVal worked as a senior aide to Governor Bruce Babbitt from 1980 to 1985. He managed Babbitt’s 1978 gubernatorial campaign and his 1988 presidential campaign.

National politics and White House 
DuVal was a founder of the Democratic Governors Association in 1983 and of the centrist Democratic Leadership Council (DLC) in 1985 and served on the Democratic National Committee from 1989 to 1993 and from 2009 to 2011. In 1993, DuVal became Deputy Chief of Protocol at the U.S. Department of State and held the position until 1996. DuVal was Deputy National Campaign Manager for Bill Clinton's 1996 presidential campaign.

In 1997, President Bill Clinton appointed DuVal as the White House Deputy Director of Intergovernmental Affairs, where he played a role in the implementation of Personal Responsibility and Work Opportunity Reconciliation Act of 1996. DuVal helped negotiate a national tobacco settlement and guided White House policy development concerning American Indian gaming rights, tribal appropriations, and Section 638. In 1999, DuVal led negotiations between the White House, governors, and mayors about Clinton Executive Order 13132. 

DuVal later became Treasurer of the Democratic Governors Association (DGA) from 2008 to 2010.

Arizona politics 
In 2002, DuVal ran unsuccessfully for Arizona's 1st congressional district in the U.S. House of Representatives. From 2002 to 2006, DuVal served on the Arizona Commerce and Economic Development Commission and Mayor Greg Stanton appointed him to the Phoenix Industrial Development Commission. 

In August 2006, DuVal was appointed to his first term on the Arizona Board of Regents by Democratic Governor Janet Napolitano and served as Chairman in 2011. As a Regent, he was co-chair of the "Getting AHEAD" initiative with Maricopa Community Colleges Chancellor Dr. Rufus Glasper. In September 2010, DuVal was appointed to an advisory group for the National Governors Association's "Complete to Compete" educational initiative. 

He was appointed to his second term in 2019 by Republican Governor Doug Ducey, his opponent. In his second term on the Arizona Regents, he led the creation of the Arizona Teachers Academy; has served as a Hunt-Kane Fellow; and has focused on higher education accountability, affordability, and access. 

In February 2013, DuVal announced his candidacy for Governor of Arizona in the 2014 election. He was endorsed by former Governor Babbitt, DuVal's former boss. DuVal lost to Republican Doug Ducey in the general election.

Other activities 
As part of his work at Clean Energy, DuVal coordinated an alternative energy development program called the Pickens Plan. DuVal  established the non-partisan the National Institute for Civil Discourse NICD at the University of Arizona after the near-fatal shooting of Rep. Gabby Giffords (D-AZ) in January 2011 He has served on the boards of the University Medical Center (University of Arizona, Tucson), Children's Action Alliance, the Udall Center for Public Policy, Prescott College, Desert Botanical Garden, the Valley of the Sun YMCA and Valley Big Brothers/Big Sisters.

Personal life and journalism 
DuVal is married to Dr. Jennifer Hecker DuVal, Ph.D, an IBH Director at the Mayo Clinic, and has two sons William and Montgomery.

He is co-author of the book Calling Arizona Home, which was published in 2005. In 2010 he wrote and published "Irons in the Fire" a collection of published opinion pieces regarding contemporary Arizona issues. DuVal is a monthly columnist for the Arizona Republic, where he has penned dozens of opinion pieces on a wide variety of issues.

References
Notes

External links

Arizona Board of Regents
Electronic archives of DuVal for Congress 2002
Alumni article in Occidental College Magazine

1954 births
Living people
American energy industry executives
Arizona Democrats
Businesspeople from Phoenix, Arizona
United States Department of State officials
Clinton administration personnel
Occidental College alumni
People from Ridgewood, New Jersey
Sandra Day O'Connor College of Law alumni
Tucson High School alumni